The 1926 Bulgarian State Football Championship was the third edition of the competition. It was contested by 11 teams, and Vladislav Varna won the championship.

Qualified teams
There was a change in the competition. The six regional sports federations were disbanded and several "okrazhni sportni oblasti", covering lesser area than their predecessors, were created on their place. Again, the winners from each OSO qualified for the State championship.

First round

|}

Quarter-finals

|}

Semi-finals

|}

Final
The final, played on 22 August 1926, with the replays on 23 Aug 1926, 26 Dec 1926 and 7 Apr 1927.

First game

Second game

Notes

References
Bulgaria - List of final tables (RSSSF)

Bulgarian State Football Championship seasons
Bul
1